Pseudovermis is genus of minute sea slugs, specifically aolid nudibranchs, marine gastropod mollusks or micromollusks in the family Pseudovermidae.

These extremely small sea slugs are meiofauna; they live among sand grains. Pseudovermis means fake worm, because these slugs resemble minute worms.

Species
Species within the genus Pseudovermis include:
 Pseudovermis artabrensis Urgorri, Cobo & Besteiro, 1991
 Pseudovermis axi Marcus Ev. & Er., 1955
 Pseudovermis boadeni Salvini-Plawen & Sterrer, 1968
 Pseudovermis chinensis Hughes, 1991
 Pseudovermis hancocki Challis, 1969
 Pseudovermis indicus Salvini-Plawen & G.C. Rao, 1973
 Pseudovermis japonicus Hamatani & Nunomura, 1973
 Pseudovermis kowalewskyi Salvini-Plawen & Sterrer, 1968
 Pseudovermis mortoni Challis, 1969
 Pseudovermis papillifer Kowalewsky, 1901
 Pseudovermis paradoxus Perejaslavtseva, 1891
 Pseudovermis salamandrops Ev. Marcus, 1953
 Pseudovermis schultzi Marcus Ev. & Er., 1955
 Pseudovermis setensis Fize, 1961
 Pseudovermis soleatus Salvini-Plawen & G.C. Rao, 1973
 Pseudovermis thompsoni Salvini-Plawen, 1991
Species brought into synonymy
 Pseudovermis papillifera Kowalevsky, 1901: synonym of Pseudovermis papillifer Kowalewsky, 1901

References

Pseudovermidae